HMS Royal Charlotte was a 6-gun yacht launched in 1824 and broken up in 1832.

Lord William Paget son of the marquess Anglesey was appointed captain of the vice-regal yacht, in November 1827 on a salary of £1,200, by the duke of Clarence for the duration of Paget's fathers, Irish lord lieutenancy.

References

 

 

1824 ships